The Women's 400 metre freestyle competition at the 2022 Mediterranean Games was held on 5 July 2022 at the Aquatic Center of the Olympic Complex in Bir El Djir.

Records
Prior to this competition, the existing world and Mediterranean Games records were as follows:

Results

Heats
The heats were started at 10:10.

Final 
The final was held at 18:04.

References

Women's 400 metre freestyle
2022 in women's swimming